The Ohaaki Power Station is a geothermal power station owned and operated by Contact Energy.  A distinctive feature of this power station is the 105 m high natural draft cooling tower, the only one of its kind in New Zealand.

Although initially constructed to generate 104 MW, decline in the steamfield has meant maximum net capacity is about 65 MW with an annual output of around 400 GWh pa.

There are currently three turbines in operation. One smaller turbine runs off high pressure steam which then backfeeds into the main intermediate pressure system that feeds the two main units. Condensers on the back end of the main turbines are fed cooled water from the cooling tower to condense the steam back into water. Additional condensate gained in this process is reinjected back into the ground.

In 2013, the Waikato Regional Council granted resource consents for a term of 35 years and for a take of 40,000 tonnes per day of geothermal fluid.

Ohaaki Marae
The plant is located adjacent to the Ohaaki Marae (Ngāti Tahu) on the banks of the Waikato River in New Zealand.  Gradual sinking of the marae has been attributed to draw-off of geothermal fluids by the power station.  The area of the marae is sinking approximately 170mm a year.  In the 1960s, the marae was moved to its present location because the previous site was flooded when the dam for the Ohakuri Power Station was filled.

References

Further reading

Geothermal power stations in New Zealand
Taupō District
Buildings and structures in the Taupo District